Sheikh Hassan Yousef (born in 1955, Ramallah) is a co-founder of Hamas. He currently serves as one of their leaders in the West Bank.

He is considered a member of Hamas' extremist faction and he refrains from any talk of rapprochement between Israel and the Palestinians. He is also considered one of the spiritual leaders of Hamas.

Yousef is married to Sabba Abu Salem. They have six sons and three daughters. His eldest son, Mosab Hassan Yousef, worked undercover with Shin Bet from 1997 to 2007 to prevent attacks on Israeli civilians, as he considered such attacks immoral and destructive to the Palestinian cause. He was disowned by his father but is considered a hero by many Americans as well as Israelis.

In July 2, 2019 Hassan's youngest son Suhib Hassan Yousef appeared in an interview with Israeli T.V. criticizing Hamas and describing it as a corrupt terrorist organization which sparked huge anger from members of Hamas describing him as a traitor and a collaborator, and other Hamas affiliated networks said that he was working with the Israeli Mossad which he completely denies.

Politics
Yousef has been arrested by the Israeli authorities several times, starting from 1993. He became the visible leader of the Second Intifada. According to the Palestinian Information Center, Yousef has spent over 23 years in Israeli prisons.

While in jail in 2005, Yousef was nominated to represent Hamas during the elections. This was against his will, as he did not think that Hamas should become a political party. He was initially unwilling to accept the nomination, but eventually agreed, when he found out that his eldest son had received death threats.

On October 19, 2015, during the ongoing Palestinian unrest, Israel Defense Forces (IDF) raided Yousef's home in Beitunia in the West Bank and arrested him, accusing him of inciting violence. He was released on August 31, 2017. A few months later, in December he was again arrested by Israeli authorities and held until October 2018. Each time he was held in Administrative detention, meaning incarceration without trial or charge. On 3 October 2020, he was arrested again.

References

1955 births
Living people
Hamas members
Al-Quds University alumni
Members of the 2006 Palestinian Legislative Council
Palestinian people imprisoned by Israel
People from Ramallah and al-Bireh Governorate